Sam McGee may refer to:
"The Cremation of Sam McGee", a poem written by Robert W. Service
Sam McGee, an American country musician of the McGee Brothers duo